The Toronto Ferry Company was formed from the merger of the Doty Ferry Company with A.J. Tymon's Island Ferry Company, two of Toronto's early ferry operators to Toronto Islands in 1890. TFC was founded and headed by businessman Lol Solman. The company's ferry license and ships were later acquired by the Toronto Transportation Commission in 1927. On March 17, 2021, The Toronto Ferry Company Inc was registered under the Ontario Business Corporations Act to Michael A. McLaughlin.

A.J. Tymon's Island Ferry Company

Captain Andrew J. Tymon (1844-?) operated a number ferries from 1880 until the formation of his own service in the mid-1880s. It later merged with John Doty's (1822-1902) Ferry Company to form TFC in 1892.

Vessels included:

 S.S. Arlington
 S.S. Prince of Wales
 S.S. Jessie L. McEdwards (1882)
 S.S. Theresa (burned 1885)
 S.S. Gertrude
 S.S. Island Queen
 S.S. Truant
 S.S. Kathleen

His son Joseph Tymon (b. 1873) would become a ferry captain for the Toronto Ferry Company.

John Doty Engine Works

John Doty was a Toronto industrialist born in Lewiston, New York in 1822. He moved his young family to Oakville, Ontario in 1851 where he established the town's first foundry and machine shop. By 1875, he, his wife Louisa Jane and two sons, Fred and Frank, moved to Toronto where John established a machine shop at the Yonge Street Wharf, 2 The Esplanade, with offices nearby at 2 Church Street.

In summer 1886 the Doty Brothers operated a ferry to Hanlan's Point. They also used the "palace steamers" Queen City and Canadian to service High Park and the Humber from York and Brock St wharves.

When the business outgrew the capacity of the premises at the Yonge Street Wharf, John Doty leased "about an acre of ground, with some buildings thereon, at the foot of Bathurst Street on the west side, and removed his works to that place in 1881." This was the former site of Dickey, Neill & Company's Soho Foundry.

In addition, The John Doty Engine Works operated a shipyard on the waterfront and established The Doty Ferry Company in 1887 with the purchase of vessels belonging to the Turner Ferry Company to provide a ferry service to the Toronto Island. In 1890, they built sister ships the Mayflower (a nod to the fact that John was a seventh generation descendant of Edward Doty who came over on the Mayflower in 1620) and the Primrose. The two sisters cost $33,000 each to construct and incorporated the latest conveniences and improvements, including electric lights.  

In 1888, the Dotys were forced to find a new location for their business when the owner of the property wanted to take over the site. "In 1889, they purchased land on the east side of Bathurst Street between Niagara and Front where they constructed a state-of-the-art plant tailored to their manufacturing needs and purchased a considerable amount of new equipment. The plant started operations in 1891 and was the largest works of its kind in Canada, specializing in the design and manufacturing of marine engines, boilers, and complete vessels, with offices and supply depots at Winnipeg and Vancouver. Doty equipment was very extensively used in the development of the Canadian North West."

Coinciding with the move to the new plant in 1890, was the sale of the Doty Ferry Company to the Toronto Ferry Company, which was incorporated as a joint stock company with financier E.B. Osler as president and Lawrence Soloman as general manager.  

John Doty became a shareholder, and the vessels belonging to the Doty Ferry Company were purchased as part of the venture. The Island Park Ferry Company and most of the other vessels in the city's ferry boat business were also acquired, giving the Toronto Ferry Company a virtual monopoly on hauling the public to and from the Island. It was reported that "six of the ferries were built by The John Doty Engine Works."

That same year, The John Doty Engine Company of Toronto (Limited) was organized. The company's officers were: John Doty, President; Daniel Hunter, Vice-President; Franklin H. Doty, General Manager; Frederic W. Doty, Secretary-Treasurer; John Walsh, Assistant Secretary-Treasurer. The following year, at the age of 70, John Doty retired from his business.

Then, on the cusp of achieving so much, there was a downturn in the market. "The compulsory move of the plant in 1891 caused a substantial strain on the company's capital and credit. The financial panic of 1892 caused the Company to go into receivership. It was taken over by the Bertram interests."

The family was forced to sell the John Doty Engine Works to their creditors, Bertram & Co. An announcement in the Globe stated that Bertram would carry on business under the good name of the "Doty Engine Works." The facility operated until 1905 under George and John Bertram as the Bertram Engine Works.

John's sons, Fred and Frank stayed on as managers for a time. This was when they built their hydraulic sand pump, a piece of equipment they would later use under contract to the City for the dredging of the Toronto Harbour.

In 1901, at the age of 79, John Doty was living with his son Fred and family in Goderich, Ontario, where Fred had established the Doty Engine Works of Goderich. Soon after, he moved back to Toronto, boarding at the home of Robert Thomas, an engineer living at 97 Ossington Avenue and employed at the Bertram Engine Works, the new owners of the factory built by John Doty. This would be his last place of residence. On 1 October 1902, at the age of eighty, he died "of the ill health incident to his advanced years."

A list of engines built by John Doty:

 high-pressure steam engine for screw steamer Mascotte 1886
 steam engine for screw steamer Jessie L. McEdwards 1876
 engine for steamer Luella 1876
 engine for steamer Sadie 1885
 ferry and engines - Mayflower and Primrose 1890
 two secondhand Doty compound steam engines would be installed in RMS Segwun during a 1925 conversion

Docks

 Doty Ferry Company docks at Hanlan's Point
 Bay Street Ferry docks (one block west of today's Jack Layton Ferry Terminal)

Fleet

A list of ships operated by the Toronto Ferry Company:

See also

 Toronto Island ferries
 Toronto Transit Commission
 Toronto Transportation Commission

References

 The Toronto Island Ferry Service
 Chapter 254 Toronto Ferry Co. 1890-93
 Capt. Andrew J. Tymon

Ferry companies of Ontario
Defunct shipping companies of Canada
Water transport in Toronto
Toronto Islands
Transport companies established in 1890
Transport companies disestablished in 1927
1890 establishments in Ontario
1927 disestablishments in Ontario
Canadian companies established in 1890